Qeshlaq-e Qanbarlui-ye Olya (also Romanized as Qeshlāq-e Qanbarlūī-ye ‘Olyā) is a village in Qeshlaq-e Gharbi Rural District, Aslan Duz District, Parsabad County, Ardabil Province, Iran. At the 2006 census, its population was 95, in 20 families.

References 

Towns and villages in Parsabad County